Pyrotherapy (artificial fever) is a method of treatment by raising the body temperature or sustaining an elevated body temperature using a fever. In general, the body temperature was maintained at 41 °C (105 °F). Many diseases were treated by this method in the first half of the 20th century. In general, it was done by exposing the patient to hot baths, warm air, or (electric) blankets. The technique reached its peak of sophistication in the early 20th century with malariotherapy, in which Plasmodium vivax, a causative agent of malaria, was allowed to infect already ill patients in order to produce intense fever for therapeutic ends. The sophistication of this approach lay in using effective anti-malarial drugs to control the P. vivax infection, while maintaining the fever it causes to the detriment of other, ongoing, and then-incurable infections present in the patient, such as late-stage syphilis. This type of pyrotherapy was most famously used by psychiatrist Julius Wagner-Jauregg, who won the Nobel Prize for Medicine in 1927 for his elaboration of the procedure in treating neurosyphilitics.

Use
Wagner-Jauregg’s 1917 treatment method, also known as malariotherapy, involved the introduction of Plasmodium vivax malaria via injection into patients with advanced stages of syphilis. Advanced syphilitic infection can invade the brain causing neurosyphilis, affecting neural performance and function, which can in turn lead to general paresis of the insane (GPI), a severely debilitating mental disorder. Doing so induced high-grade (103 °F, 39.4 °C or above) fever that was easily sustainable to eradicate invading spirochaetal bacterium Treponema pallidum, the pathogen responsible for syphilitic infection. Successive rounds of treatment were required to fully eradicate the infectious bacteria, while simultaneously using quinine to treat the malaria infection. Management of the fevers was risky as malaria fevers can sometimes cause death, but syphilis was a proliferate and terminal disease at the time with no other viable treatment. This procedure was used to treat syphilis until penicillin was found to be a safer, more effective measure in the 1940s.

The general paresis of the insane caused by neurosyphilis was effectively overcome by the method.

Pyrotherapy was also employed in psychiatry. Of note here is the use of sulfozinum and pyrogenal that was relatively widespread in Soviet psychiatry. Against schizophrenia "Saprovitan" and "Pyrifer" were tried.

Effectiveness 
In 1921, Wagner-Jauregg reported impressive success and many other physicians attempting malaria induced pyrotherapy made similar claims. Later analyses have shown this might not have been true since approximately 60% would relapse within 2 years and 3–20% died from the resulting fevers. Significant consideration should be used here, as syphilis was considered deadly and without other treatment options pyrotherapy was used as a heroic measure.

Citations

General bibliography 
 

History of medicine
Therapy